"The Pride" is a 1977 funk song by The Isley Brothers, released on their T-Neck imprint. The song, which was the first single released from their album, Go For Your Guns, was written as a warning to politicians to be the leader that the people need and to others who want change reminding them that "the pride makes (them) feel that (they) belong". The song was one of several socially conscious political songs the Isleys recorded throughout the 1970s including "Fight the Power Pts. 1 & 2" and "Harvest for the World". While the song peaked at sixty-three on the pop charts, it reached number-one on the R&B singles chart becoming the group's third number one on the chart.

Personnel
Ronald Isley: lead vocals, background vocals
Rudolph Isley: background vocals 
O'Kelly Isley Jr.: background vocals
Ernie Isley: drums, congas, electric guitar, background vocals
Marvin Isley: bass played by, background vocals 
Chris Jasper: tambourine, piano, clavinet, keyboards, synthesizers, background vocals 

Sources:

References

1977 singles
The Isley Brothers songs
Songs written by Ronald Isley
Songs written by O'Kelly Isley Jr.
Songs written by Rudolph Isley
Songs written by Chris Jasper
Songs written by Marvin Isley
Songs written by Ernie Isley
1977 songs
T-Neck Records singles